Papilio ufipa is a species of swallowtail butterfly from the genus Papilio that is found in Tanzania. The habitat consists of riparian and montane forests at altitudes from 1000 to 2400 meters.

Taxonomy
Papilio ufipa belongs to a clade called the nireus species group with 15 members.  The pattern is black with green bands and spots and the butterflies, although called swallowtails lack tails with the exception of Papilio charopus and Papilio hornimani.  The clade members are:

Papilio aristophontes Oberthür, 1897
Papilio nireus Linnaeus, 1758
Papilio charopus Westwood, 1843
Papilio chitondensis de Sousa & Fernandes, 1966
Papilio chrapkowskii Suffert, 1904
Papilio chrapkowskoides Storace, 1952
Papilio desmondi van Someren, 1939
Papilio hornimani Distant, 1879
Papilio interjectana Vane-Wright, 1995
Papilio manlius Fabricius, 1798
Papilio microps Storace, 1951
Papilio sosia Rothschild & Jordan, 1903
Papilio thuraui Karsch, 1900
Papilio ufipa Carcasson, 1961
Papilio wilsoni Rothschild, 1926

Description
Median band narrower, straighter and bluer than in other East African races (of Papilio bromius). Submarginal spots below very large, paler mottling absent. Very similar to Papilio desmondi and can only be determined with certainty by dissection.

References

Endemic fauna of Tanzania
ufipa
Butterflies described in 1961